Platani ("place with a platanus", previously ) is a Turkish Cypriot village in the Famagusta District of Cyprus, located  north of Lefkoniko. Platani is under the de facto control of Northern Cyprus. It is locally known for the nearby stalactite cave "Incirli Mağra". As of 2011, Platani had a population of 183.

References

Communities in Famagusta District
Populated places in Gazimağusa District